"Middle of the Road" is a single that appears on The Pretenders' album Learning to Crawl.

The song peaked at number 19 on the US pop singles chart and number 2 on the US mainstream rock chart in January 1984, where it stayed for four weeks.

Composition
Singer-songwriter Chrissie Hynde has stated that "Middle of the Road" refers to Tao Te Ching, which she interprets as "the middle way."  According to Charles M. Young of Musician, the song is about "getting out there and mixing it up with the world." The song's lyrics include observations about the difference between wealth and poverty that Hynde had observed. The lyrics also refer to autobiographical details (i.e., the lyric "I got a kid, I'm thirty-three" although Hynde had just turned 32 when the single was released). The harmonica solo near the end of the song is uncredited. Ultimate Classic Rock attributes the solo to Hynde, who usually plays it during live performances of the song.

"Middle of the Road" uses a 4/4 time signature. Hynde has acknowledged that "Middle of the Road" uses the same chords as the Rolling Stones' song "Empty Heart" and that it does not have much melody.  She says that it uses basic chords and that it is like "a regular R&B song," going on to say that "it's like taking a basic format, like the blues, and just giving it new lyrics."  She describes Robbie McIntosh's guitar solo as "nifty."  Audio Magazine compared the song's structure to that of Dobie Gray's "The 'In' Crowd."

Reception
Allmusic critic Liana Jonas called "Middle of the Road" a "classic example of pure, unadulterated rock music." She ascribed this to the fact that the lyrics focus on people's innate desire to "get up and go" and the "driven" music backs up the sentiment. Fellow Allmusic critic Mark Deming called it a "furious rocker." Ultimate Classic Rock critic Matt Wardlaw rated it the Pretenders 7th greatest song, saying that "The Pretenders kick out the jams in fine fashion, from that famous opening drum break to Chrissie herself wrapping things up with a killer harmonica solo." Ultimate Classic Rock critic Bryan Wawzenek rated it as drummer Martin Chambers' top Pretenders song, saying that "he gets to do a little bit of everything: swing for the fences on the danceable beat, wake Chrissie Hynde from her daydream with a pair of lightning quick snare hits and keep pushing, pulling and racing to the song’s harmonica-drenched conclusion."

In 1989, the song was donated to a double album for Greenpeace along with other songs that had environmental or other earth-sensitive subjects titled Greenpeace: Rainbow Warriors.

Charts

References

1983 songs
1984 singles
The Pretenders songs
Songs written by Chrissie Hynde
Song recordings produced by Chris Thomas (record producer)
Sire Records singles